WSUR may refer to:

WSUR-DT, a satellite station of WLII-DT
Washington State University Reactor
The former callsign of WXSU-LP